Hiruma is a Japanese surname. Notable people with the surname include:

 Toshi Hiruma, American film producer

Fictional characters
 Yoichi Hiruma, a character in the manga series Eyeshield 21
 Hiruma Brothers, a pair of characters in the manga series Rurouni Kenshin

Japanese-language surnames